Mondaingbin is a village in Ye-U Township, Sagaing Region, Myanmar and is the primary village in the Mondaingbin village tract.

On 12 May 2022, Myanmar Army allegedly carried out an massacre of civilians from the village.

References 

Populated places in Sagaing Region